Jim McWithey (July 4, 1927 – February 1, 2009) was an American racecar driver. He was born in Grammer, Indiana.

McWithey raced in the USAC Championship Car series in the 1956, 1957, 1959 and 1960 seasons, with 20 career starts, including the 1959 and 1960 Indianapolis 500 races.  He finished in the top ten 9 times, with his best finish in 3rd position in 1960 at Trenton. His best season was 1959, when he placed fourth three times and also won dirt track sprint car features at Terre Haute, and Williams Grove. He died in February 2009 in Gainesville, Georgia, aged 81.

Indy 500 results

Complete Formula One World Championship results
(key)

References

1927 births
2009 deaths
Indianapolis 500 drivers
People from Bartholomew County, Indiana
Racing drivers from Indiana